Stockton-on-Tees Borough Council is the local authority of the Borough of Stockton-on-Tees. It is a unitary authority, having the powers of a non-metropolitan county and district council combined. It provides a full range of local government services including Council Tax billing, libraries, social services, processing planning applications, waste collection and disposal, and it is a local education authority.

Powers and functions
The local authority derives its powers and functions from the Local Government Act 1972 and subsequent legislation. For the purposes of local government, Stockton-on-Tees is within a non-metropolitan area of England. As a unitary authority, Stockton-on-Tees Borough Council has the powers and functions of both a non-metropolitan county and district council combined. In its capacity as a district council it is a billing authority collecting Council Tax and business rates, it processes local planning applications, it is responsible for housing, waste collection and environmental health. In its capacity as a county council it is a local education authority, responsible for social services, libraries and waste disposal.

Town and parish councils

Political control

Since 2019 the council has been under no overall control. At the 2019 Stockton-on-Tees Borough Council election, Labour lost its majority on the council, but remained the largest party and now runs a minority administration. The leader of the council is Bob Cook of Labour, who has been in post since 2011.

References

Unitary authority councils of England
Local education authorities in England
Local authorities in County Durham
Local authorities in North Yorkshire
Leader and cabinet executives
Billing authorities in England
Politics of the Borough of Stockton-on-Tees